Moschi or Moschoi is a term from ancient records, and may refer to one of the following peoples:

Mushki, an Iron Age people of Anatolia, known from Assyrian sources
Moschia, a part of the Caucasus Mountains also associated with the Moschi/Moschoi
Meskheti, a region and former province of Georgia located within Moschia
Meskhetians, people from Meskheti
Meskhetian Turks, the former Muslim inhabitants of Meskheti, which is along the border with Turkey

See also
Moshi (disambiguation)